Perespa-Kolonia  is a village in the administrative district of Gmina Tyszowce, within Tomaszów Lubelski County, Lublin Voivodeship, in eastern Poland.

The village has a population of 200.

References

Perespa-Kolonia